Sir Murray Gordon Halberg  (7 July 1933 – 30 November 2022) was a New Zealand middle-distance runner who won the gold medal in the 5000 metres event at the 1960 Olympics. He also won gold medals in the 3 miles events at the 1958 and 1962 Commonwealth Games. He worked for the welfare of children with disabilities since he founded the Halberg Trust in 1963.

Biography
Born in Eketāhuna on 7 July 1933, Halberg later moved to Auckland, where he attended Avondale College. He was a rugby player in his youth, but suffered a severe injury during a game, leaving his left arm withered. The next year, he took up running, seemingly being only more motivated by his disability. In 1951, he met Arthur Lydiard, who became his coach. Lydiard had been a famous long-distance runner, and had new ideas on the training of athletes. Three years later, Halberg broke through, winning his first national title on the senior level.

At the 1954 British Empire and Commonwealth Games he placed fifth in the mile. At the 1956 Olympics in Melbourne, Australia, he placed eleventh in the 1500 metres. Halberg won the gold medal in the three miles at the 1958 British Empire and Commonwealth Games and later the same year became the first sub four-minute miler from New Zealand. He won the New Zealand Sportsman of the Year for 1958.

For the 1960 Rome Olympics, Halberg focused on the longer distances, entering in the 5000 and 10000 m. Halberg won the 5000 m gold, on the same day countryman Peter Snell was victorious in the 800 m. Halberg later placed fifth in the 10,000 m.

The following year, Halberg set four world records in events over imperial distances. After carrying the flag at the opening ceremonies, Halberg successfully defended his  three-mile title at the 1962 British Empire and Commonwealth Games. He closed out his running career at the 1964 Summer Olympics in Tokyo, finishing seventh in the 10,000 m.

In the 1961 New Year Honours, Halberg was appointed a Member of the Order of the British Empire, for services to athletics. In the 1988 New Year Honours, he was appointed a Knight Bachelor, for services to sport and crippled children. In the 2008 Queen's Birthday Honours, Halberg was appointed to the Order of New Zealand. The following month he became only the fourth person to be awarded the Blake Medal, named after fellow countryman Sir Peter Blake, for his more than 50 years' service to athletics, and to children with disabilities. In 1963 he set up The Halberg Trust, which supports children with disabilities to be active in sport, creation and leisure. The organisation rebranded in 2012 to become the Halberg Disability Sport Foundation. For many years the organisation has managed the New Zealand Sportsman of the Year Award, which is now called the Halberg Awards.

Halberg House of Hutt International Boys' School is named after Sir Murray Halberg, and students in the house earn what are called "meter points" which relates to Sir Murray Halberg and his running career. Tauranga Boys' College also named a house after Sir Murray Halberg. Halberg Crescent, in the Hamilton suburb of Chartwell, is named in Halberg's honour.

Halberg died in Auckland on 30 November 2022, at the age of 89.

References

Bibliography 
 A Clean Pair Of Heels: The Murray Halberg Story by Murray Halberg, with Garth Gilmour

External links

 Page with Photo, one of two at Sporting Heroes

|-

|-

1933 births
2022 deaths
New Zealand male middle-distance runners
New Zealand male long-distance runners
Olympic athletes of New Zealand
Olympic gold medalists for New Zealand
Medalists at the 1960 Summer Olympics
Athletes (track and field) at the 1956 Summer Olympics
Athletes (track and field) at the 1960 Summer Olympics
Athletes (track and field) at the 1964 Summer Olympics
Athletes (track and field) at the 1954 British Empire and Commonwealth Games
Athletes (track and field) at the 1958 British Empire and Commonwealth Games
Athletes (track and field) at the 1962 British Empire and Commonwealth Games
Commonwealth Games gold medallists for New Zealand
New Zealand Members of the Order of the British Empire
Members of the Order of New Zealand
New Zealand Knights Bachelor
New Zealand people of German descent
People in sports awarded knighthoods
Commonwealth Games medallists in athletics
People educated at Avondale College
People from Eketāhuna
Olympic gold medalists in athletics (track and field)
Medallists at the 1958 British Empire and Commonwealth Games
Medallists at the 1962 British Empire and Commonwealth Games